Tea and Sympathy may refer to:
 Tea and Sympathy (play), a 1953 play by Robert Anderson
 Tea and Sympathy (film), a 1956 adaptation of the play directed by Vincente Minnelli
 "Tea and Sympathy", a song by Janis Ian from the album Between the Lines, 1975
 "Tea and Sympathy", a song by Jars of Clay from the album Much Afraid, 1997
 Tea & Sympathy (Bernard Fanning album), 2005
 Tea & Sympathy, a 2009 album by Billie Myers